Gafurovo (Ğäfür) is a rural locality (a selo) in Gafurovsky Selsoviet, Tuymazinsky District, Bashkortostan, Russia. The population was 1,083 as of 2010. There are 25 streets.

Geography 
Gafurovo is located 9 km south of Tuymazy (the district's administrative centre) by road. Timirovo is the nearest rural locality.

References 

Rural localities in Tuymazinsky District